Tristan Okpalaugo (born October 10, 1989) is an American football outside linebacker who is currently a free agent. He signed with the Miami Dolphins as undrafted free agent in 2013. He played college football at Fresno State.

Early years
He attended Granada High School in Livermore, California. He was selected to the First team East Bay Athletics All-League in 2007 in which he played defensive end, wide receiver and tight end in high school. He was named an honorable mention for the All-Metro football team in his senior year in high school. He was named as Granada High School Most Improved Player in 2007. He also played other sports including basketball and competed in track and field was selected to the first-team East Bay Athletics All-League basketball team twice during high school.

Professional career

Miami Dolphins 
On April 27, 2013, he signed with the Miami Dolphins as an undrafted free agent following the 2013 NFL Draft. He failed to make the 53 man roster.

Minnesota Vikings 
On September 2, 2013, he was signed as a defensive end for the Minnesota Vikings practice squad and then released on September 10, 2013.

Toronto Argonauts
Okpalaugo was signed by the Toronto Argonauts (CFL) on June 22, 2014. He was the East Division nominee for the CFL's Most Outstanding Rookie Award in 2014, winning the Frank M. Gibson Trophy.

Arizona Cardinals
Okpalaugo was signed by the Arizona Cardinals on February 19, 2016. On September 3, 2016, he was waived/injured by the Cardinals and placed on injured reserve. On September 12, he was released from the Cardinals' injured reserve.

Winnipeg Blue Bombers
On February 8, 2017, Okpalaugo signed a two-year contract with the Winnipeg Blue Bombers (CFL).

Personal
Okpalaugo is also the son of Chris and Mary Ann Okpalaugo of Livermore, California.

References

External links 
 Fresno State bio
 Toronto Argonauts bio
 Miami Dolphins bio
 Minnesota Vikings bio

Living people
Miami Dolphins players
1989 births
American football defensive ends
Canadian football defensive linemen
American players of Canadian football
Fresno State Bulldogs football players
Minnesota Vikings players
Dallas Cowboys players
Toronto Argonauts players
Winnipeg Blue Bombers players
Players of American football from California
Sportspeople from Alameda County, California
People from Livermore, California
Canadian Football League Rookie of the Year Award winners